Edward Michael Bankes Green (20 August 1930 – 6 February 2019) was a British theologian, Anglican priest, Christian apologist and author of more than 50 books.

Early life, education and ministry 
Green's mother was Australian and his father was Welsh. He became a committed Christian through the ministry of E. J. H. Nash (known as "Bash"). He was educated at Clifton College and Exeter College, Oxford (Bachelor of Arts 1953, Master of Arts 1956) and subsequently at Queens' College, Cambridge (Bachelor of Arts 1957, Master of Arts 1961, Bachelor of Divinity 1966) while preparing for ordained ministry at Ridley Hall. He was admitted to the degree of Doctor of Divinity by the Archbishop of Canterbury (1996) and the University of Toronto (1992). He was ordained deacon in 1957 and priest in 1958.

Green was an assistant curate of Holy Trinity, Eastbourne (1957–60), a tutor at the London College of Divinity (1960–69), Principal of St John's College, Nottingham (1969–75) and Rector of St Aldate's Church, Oxford and chaplain of the Oxford Pastorate (1975–86). He had additionally been an honorary canon of Coventry Cathedral from 1970 to 1978. He then moved to Canada where he was Professor of Evangelism at Regent College, Vancouver from 1987 to 1992. He returned to England to take up the position of advisor to the Archbishop of Canterbury and the Archbishop of York for the Springboard Decade of Evangelism. In 1993 he was appointed the Six Preacher of Canterbury Cathedral. Despite having officially retired in 1996, he became a Senior Research Fellow and Head of Evangelism and Apologetics at Wycliffe Hall, Oxford in 1997. He lived in the town of Abingdon near Oxford.

Green was married to Rosemary for 61 years, and they had four children: Tim, Sarah, Jenny, and Jonathan.

Apologetics and evangelism 
Green was a prolific writer, with much of his work written for a popular reading audience, although he also contributed to academic studies. Many of his best known books discuss the twin topics of evangelism and apologetics.

One of Green's objectives was to equip lay Christian believers in their grasp of the gospel message and to then have confidence to converse with others about faith matters. These practical objectives are clear in books such as Evangelism, Now and Then and Sharing Your Faith With Friends and Family. At a technical level Green contributed an academic study of the praxis and theory of evangelism in Evangelism in the Early Church. This work explores the development of evangelism through the New Testament texts and from the early Church Fathers. He built on those foundational studies in his advocacy of evangelism at a parish church level, both through his personal ministry and in his book Evangelism Through the Local Church.

Green's apologetic work generally focussed on popular misconceptions and objections held by non-Christians. In books such as You Must Be Joking, World on the Run and Why Bother With Jesus, he dealt with attitudes of religious indifference and scepticism. He also addressed a variety of objections concerning religious hypocrisy and religious pluralism as well as popular questions of doubt and unbelief. He also examined the evidences for the life, death and resurrection of Christ in Man Alive and again in the revision of that book, The Day Death Died.

Green also explored academic challenges to faith, such as in the collection of essays he prepared as a reply to Don Cupitt's work on The Myth of God Incarnate, which were published less than six months later under the title The Truth of God Incarnate. In that analysis Green and his colleagues addressed the problems of myth and history as propounded in modern biblical scholarship, especially concerning the relationship between the events of Jesus' ministry and teaching and the doctrine of the Incarnation.

One of Green's more recent works, The Books the Church Suppressed: Fiction and Truth in The Da Vinci Code, is an argument for orthodox Christianity against Gnosticism as presented in The Da Vinci Code.  Green here linked Gnosticism with a decline in society.  He also claimed that Gnosticism leads to a decline in morality, so that by ordaining a homosexual bishop the Episcopal Church of the United States has itself shown Gnostic tendencies. He considered aspects of apologetic methodology and strategy in his co-authored work with Alister McGrath.

Aside from his apologetic writings, Green also addressed issues of discipleship in the Christian life, ministry and leadership in the church, the doctrine of baptism, pneumatology (study of the Holy Spirit) and demonology. He also wrote non-technical commentaries on certain books of the New Testament. In 2 Peter Reconsidered he provided a solid exegesis and defended the authenticity of the book; through his interpretation he also showed his Arminianism.

Adventure of Faith is his spiritual autobiography.

Works

Books

Edited by
  Grand Rapids, Mich.: Eerdmans, 1977  OLCC 3292512

Chapters

Autobiography
Adventure of Faith: Reflections on 50 Years of Christian Service, Zondervan, Grand Rapids, 2001

References

Citations

Sources

External links
Wycliffe Hall biography

1930 births
2019 deaths
20th-century English Anglican priests
Alumni of Exeter College, Oxford
Alumni of Queens' College, Cambridge
Alumni of Ridley Hall, Cambridge
Anglican writers
Christian apologists
English Anglican theologians
English Anglicans
Fellows of Wycliffe Hall, Oxford
People educated at Clifton College
Staff of St John's College, Nottingham
University of Toronto alumni